This is a list of unincorporated communities in the Commonwealth of Virginia that are not incorporated as independent cities or towns . Bolded places are census-designated places; there are 362 of them as of the 2010 United States Census.

A
 Abbs Valley (Tazewell County)
 Adwolf (Smyth County)
 Afton (Albemarle County and Nelson County)
 Aldie (Loudoun County)
 Allison Gap (Smyth County)
 Allisonia (Pulaski County)
 Alton (Halifax County)
 Amelia Court House (Amelia County)
 Amonate (Tazewell County)
 Annandale (Fairfax County)
 Apple Mountain Lake (Warren County)
 Aquia Harbour (Stafford County)
 Arcola (Loudoun County)
 Arlington (Arlington County)
 Arrington (Nelson County)
 Ashburn (Loudoun County)
 Atkins (Smyth County)
 Atlantic (Accomack County)
 Atlee (Hanover County)
 Augusta Springs (Augusta County)
 Austinville (Wythe County)

B
 Bailey's Crossroads (Fairfax County)
 Ballston (Arlington County)
 Barboursville (Orange County)
 Baskerville (Mecklenburg County)
 Bassett (Henry County)
 Basye (Shenandoah County)
 Bayside (Accomack County)
 Bayview (Northampton County)
 Baywood (Grayson County)
 Beach (Chesterfield County)
 Bealeton (Fauquier County)
 Belle Haven (Fairfax County)
 Bellwood (Chesterfield County)
 Belmont (Loudoun County)
 Belmont Estates (Rockingham County)
 Belspring (Pulaski County)
 Belview (Montgomery County)
 Benns Church (Isle of Wight County)
 Bensley (Chesterfield County)
 Bermuda Hundred (Chesterfield County)
 Bethel Manor (York County)
 Big Island (Bedford County)
 Blairs (Pittsylvania County)
 Bland (Bland County)
 Blue Ridge (Botetourt County)
 Blue Ridge Shores (Louisa County)
 Bobtown (Accomack County)
 Bon Air (Chesterfield County)
 Boston (Accomack County)
 Boswell's Corner (Stafford County)
 Bracey (Mecklenburg County)
 Brambleton (Loudoun County)
 Brandermill (Chesterfield County)
 Brightwood (Madison County)
 Bristow (Prince William County)
 Broadlands (Loudoun County)
 Brownsburg (Rockbridge County)
 Buckhall (Prince William County)
 Buckingham (Buckingham County)
 Bull Run (Prince William County)
 Bull Run Mountain Estates (Prince William County)
 Bumpass (Louisa County)
 Burke (Fairfax County)
 Burke Centre (Fairfax County)

C
 Callaghan (Alleghany County)
 Callands (Pittsylvania County)
 Calverton (Fauquier County)
 Camptown (Isle of Wight County)
 Cana (Carroll County)
 Captains Cove (Accomack County)
 Carrollton (Isle of Wight County)
 Carrsville (Isle of Wight County)
 Cascades (Loudoun County)
 Castlewood (Russell County)
 Catlett (Fauquier County)
 Cats Bridge (Accomack County)
 Cave Spring (Roanoke County)
 Central Garage (King William County)
 Centralia (Chesterfield County)
 Centreville (Fairfax County)
 Chamberlayne (Henrico County)
 Champlain (Essex County)
 Chantilly (Fairfax County)
 Charles City (Charles City County)
 Chase Crossing (Accomack County)
 Chatmoss (Henry County)
 Cherry Hill (Prince William County)
 Chester (Chesterfield County)
 Chester Gap (Rappahannock County and Warren County)
 Chesterfield (Chesterfield County)
 Church Road (Dinwiddie County)
 Churchville (Augusta County)
 Cismont (Albemarle County)
 Clarendon (Arlington County)
 Claypool Hill (Tazewell County)
 Clover (Halifax County)
 Cloverdale (Botetourt County)
 Cluster Springs (Halifax County)
 Collierstown (Rockbridge County)
 Collinsville (Henry County)
 Columbia (Fluvanna County)
 Concord (Appomattox County and Campbell County)
 Copper Hill (Floyd County)
 Countryside (Loudoun County)
 County Center (Prince William County)
 Criglersville (Madison County)
 Crimora (Augusta County)
 Crosspointe (Fairfax County)
 Crozet (Albemarle County)
 Cullen (Charlotte County)
 Cumberland (Cumberland County)

D
 Dahlgren (King George County)
 Dahlgren Center (King George County)
 Dale City (Prince William County)
 Daleville (Botetourt County)
 Dante (Dickenson County and Russell County)
 Deep Creek (Accomack County)
 Deep Run (Henrico County)
 Deerfield (Augusta County)
 Deltaville (Middlesex County)
 Dinwiddie (Dinwiddie County)
 Disputanta (Prince George County)
 Dooms (Augusta County)
 Doswell (Hanover County)
 Dranesville (Fairfax County)
 Draper (Pulaski County)
 Dryden (Lee County)
 Dulles Town Center (Loudoun County)
 Dumbarton (Henrico County)
 Dunn Loring (Fairfax County)
 Dyke (Greene County)

E
 East Falls Church (Arlington County)
 East Highland Park (Henrico County)
 East Lexington (Rockbridge County)
 Ebony (Brunswick County)
 Elk Creek (Grayson County)
 Elliston (Montgomery County)
 Emory (Washington County)
 Enon (Chesterfield County)
 Esmont (Albemarle County)
 Etlan (Madison County)
 Ettrick (Chesterfield County)
 Ewing (Lee County)

F
 Fagg (Montgomery County)
 Fair Lakes (Fairfax County)
 Fair Oaks (Fairfax County)
 Fair Oaks (Henrico County)
 Fairfax Station (Fairfax County)
 Fairlawn (Pulaski County)
 Fairview (Mecklenburg County)
 Fairview Beach (King George County)
 Falmouth (Stafford County)
 Fancy Gap (Carroll County)
 Farnham (Richmond County)
 Ferrum (Franklin County)
 Fieldale (Henry County)
 Fishersville (Augusta County)
 Flint Hill (Rappahannock County)
 Floris (Fairfax County)
 Ford (Dinwiddie County)
 Forest (Bedford County)
 Fort Belvoir (Fairfax County)
 Fort Blackmore (Scott County)
 Fort Chiswell (Wythe County)
 Fort Hunt (Fairfax County)
 Fort Lee (Prince George County)
 Fox (Grayson County)
 Franconia (Fairfax County)
 Franklin Farm (Fairfax County)
 Franktown (Northampton County)
 Free Union (Albemarle County)

G
 Gainesville (Prince William County)
 Gargatha (Accomack County)
 Gasburg (Brunswick County)
 George Mason (Fairfax County)
 Gilmore Mills (Rockbridge County)
 Glen Allen (Henrico County)
 Glenvar (Roanoke County)
 Gloucester Courthouse (Gloucester County)
 Gloucester Point (Gloucester County)
 Goldbond (Giles County)
 Goochland (Goochland County)
 Gore (Frederick County)
 Gratton (Tazewell County)
 Great Bridge (City of Chesapeake)
 Great Falls (Fairfax County)
 Greenbackville (Accomack County)
 Greenbriar (Fairfax County)
 Greenbush (Accomack County)
 Greenville (Augusta County)
 Grove (James City County)
 Groveton (Fairfax County)
 Gwynn (Mathews County)

H
 Hampden Sydney (Prince Edward County)
 Hanover (Hanover County)
 Harborton (Accomack County)
 Harriston (Augusta County)
 Hayfield (Fairfax County)
 Heathsville (Northumberland County)
 Henry Fork (Franklin County)
 Highland Springs (Henrico County)
 Hiltons (Scott County)
 Hinton (Rockingham County)
 Hiwassee (Pulaski County)
 Holland (City of Suffolk)
 Hollins (Botetourt County and Roanoke County)
 Hollymead (Albemarle County)
 Hood (Madison County)
 Horntown (Accomack County)
 Horse Pasture (Henry County)
 Hot Springs (Bath County)
 Huntington (Fairfax County)
 Hybla Valley (Fairfax County)

I
 Idylwood (Fairfax County)
 Independent Hill (Prince William County)
 Index (King George County)
 Innsbrook (Henrico County)
 Ivanhoe (Wythe County)
 Ivy (Albemarle County)

J
 Jamestown (James City County)
 Jolivue (Augusta County)

K
 Kempsville (City of Virginia Beach)
 Keokee (Lee County)
 King and Queen Court House (King and Queen County)
 King George (King George County)
 King William (King William County)
 Kings Park (Fairfax County)
 Kings Park West (Fairfax County)
 Kingstowne (Fairfax County)

L
 Ladysmith (Caroline County)
 Lafayette (Montgomery County)
 Lake Barcroft (Fairfax County)
 Lake Caroline (Caroline County)
 Lake Holiday (Frederick County)
 Lake Land'Or (Caroline County)
 Lake Monticello (Fluvanna County)
 Lake of the Woods (Orange County)
 Lake Ridge (Prince William County)
 Lake Wilderness (Spotsylvania County)
 Lakeside (Henrico County)
 Lancaster (Lancaster County)
 Lansdowne (Loudoun County)
 Laurel (Henrico County)
 Laurel Hill (Fairfax County)
 Laurel Park (Henry County)
 Laymantown (Botetourt County)
 Lee Mont (Accomack County)
 Leedstown (Westmoreland County)
 Liberty (Caroline County)
 Liberty (Fauquier County)
 Liberty (Halifax County)
 Liberty (Highland County)
 Liberty (Tazewell County)
 Lincolnia (Fairfax County)
 Linton Hall (Prince William County)
 Lively (Lancaster County)
 Loch Lomond (Prince William County)
 Long Branch (Fairfax County)
 Lorton (Fairfax County)
 Loudoun Valley Estates (Loudoun County)
 Lovingston (Nelson County)
 Low Moor (Alleghany County)
 Lowes Island (Loudoun County)
 Lunenburg (Lunenburg County)
 Lyndhurst (Augusta County)

M
 Machipongo (Northampton County)
 Madison Heights (Amherst County)
 Makemie Park (Accomack County)
 Manchester (Chesterfield County)
 Mantua (Fairfax County)
 Mappsburg (Accomack County)
 Mappsville (Accomack County)
 Marksville (Page County)
 Marlbrook (Rockbridge County)
 Marshall (Fauquier County)
 Marumsco (Prince William County)
 Mason Neck (Fairfax County)
 Massanetta Springs (Rockingham County)
 Massanutten (Rockingham County)
 Massaponax (Spotsylvania County)
 Mathews (Mathews County)
 Matoaca (Chesterfield County)
 Maurertown (Shenandoah County)
 Max Meadows (Wythe County)
 McGaheysville (Rockingham County)
 McLean (Fairfax County)
 McMullin (Smyth County)
 McNair (Fairfax County)
 Meadowbrook (Chesterfield County)
 Meadowview (Washington County)
 Mechanicsville (Hanover County)
 Mechanicsville (Rockbridge County)
 Merrifield (Fairfax County)
 Merrimac (Montgomery County)
 Metompkin (Accomack County)
 Middlebrook (Augusta County)
 Midland (Fauquier County)
 Midlothian (Chesterfield County)
 Modest Town (Accomack County)
 Montclair (Prince William County)
 Montrose (Henrico County)
 Montvale (Bedford County)
 Moorefield Station (Loudoun County)
 Moseley (Powhatan County)
 Motley (Pittsylvania County)
 Mount Hermon (Pittsylvania County)
 Mount Sidney (Augusta County)
 Mount Solon (Augusta County)
 Mount Vernon (Fairfax County)
 Mountain Road (Halifax County)
 Mouth of Wilson (Grayson County)

N
 Nathalie (Halifax County)
 Natural Bridge (Rockbridge County)
 Natural Bridge Station (Rockbridge County)
 Neabsco (Prince William County)
 Nellysford (Nelson County)
 Nelsonia (Accomack County)
 New Baltimore (Fauquier County)
 New Bohemia (Prince George County)
 New Church (Accomack County)
 New Hope (Augusta County)
 New Kent (New Kent County)
 New River (Pulaski County)
 Newington (Fairfax County)
 Newington Forest (Fairfax County)
 Nokesville (Prince William County)
 Norge (James City County)
 North Shore (Franklin County)
 North Springfield (Fairfax County)
 Nottoway (Nottoway County)
 Nurney (City of Suffolk)

O
 Oak Grove (Loudoun County)
 Oak Hall (Accomack County)
 Oak Level (Henry County)
 Oakton (Fairfax County)
 Opal (Fauquier County)

P
 Paint Bank (Craig County)
 Palmyra (Fluvanna County)
 Pantops (Albemarle County)
 Paris (Fauquier County)
 Parrott (Pulaski County)
 Partlow (Spotsylvania County)
 Passapatanzy (King George County)
 Pastoria (Accomack County)
 Patrick Springs (Patrick County)
 Penhook (Franklin County)
 Pimmit Hills (Fairfax County)
 Piney Mountain (Albemarle County)
 Plum Creek (Montgomery County)
 Poindexter (Louisa County)
 Port Republic (Rockingham County)
 Potomac Mills (Prince William County)
 Powhatan (Powhatan County)
 Prices Fork (Montgomery County)
 Prince George (Prince George County)
 Princess Anne (City of Virginia Beach)
 Pungoteague (Accomack County)

Q
 Quantico Base (Prince William County and Stafford County)
 Quinby (Accomack County)
 Quinque (Greene County)
 Quinton (New Kent County)

R
 Randolph (Charlotte County)
 Raphine (Rockbridge County)
 Rapidan (Culpeper County)
 Raven (Russell County and Tazewell County)
 Ravensworth (Fairfax County)
 Red Oak (Charlotte County)
 Rescue (Isle of Wight County)
 Reston (Fairfax County)
 Riner (Montgomery County)
 Ripplemead (Giles County)
 Rivanna (Albemarle County)
 Riverdale (Halifax County)
 Riverview (Wise County)
 Robley (Richmond County)
 Rockbridge Baths (Rockbridge County)
 Rockwood (Chesterfield County)
 Rose Hill (Fairfax County)
 Rose Hill (Lee County)
 Ruckersville (Greene County)
 Rushmere (Isle of Wight County)
 Rustburg (Campbell County)

S
 Saluda (Middlesex County)
 Sandston (Henrico County)
 Sandy Level (Henry County)
 Sanford (Accomack County)
 Savage Town (Accomack County)
 Savageville (Accomack County)
 Saxe (Charlotte County)
 Schuyler (Nelson County)
 Scotland (Surry County)
 Sedley (Southampton County)
 Selma (Alleghany County)
 Seven Corners (Fairfax County)
 Seven Mile Ford (Smyth County)
 Seven Pines (Henrico County)
 Shacklefords (King and Queen County)
 Shawnee Land (Frederick County)
 Shawsville (Montgomery County)
 Shenandoah Farms (Clarke County and Warren County)
 Shenandoah Retreat (Clarke County)
 Shenandoah Shores (Warren County)
 Sherando (Augusta County)
 Shipman (Nelson County)
 Short Pump (Henrico County)
 Skinquarter (Chesterfield County)
 Skippers (Greensville County)
 Skyland Estates (Warren County)
 Snowville (Pulaski County)
 South Chesconessex (Accomack County)
 South Riding (Loudoun County)
 South Run (Fairfax County)
 Southampton Meadows (Southampton County)
 Southern Gateway (Stafford County)
 Sperryville (Rappahannock County)
 Spotsylvania Courthouse (Spotsylvania County)
 Springfield (Fairfax County)
 Springville (Tazewell County)
 Stafford (Stafford County)
 Staffordsville (Giles County)
 Stanleytown (Henry County)
 Steeles Tavern (Rockbridge County)
 Sterling (Loudoun County)
 Stone Ridge (Loudoun County)
 Stuarts Draft (Augusta County)
 Sudley (Prince William County)
 Sugar Grove (Smyth County)
 Sugarland Run (Loudoun County)
 Sussex (Sussex County)
 Syria (Madison County)

T
 Tabb (York County)
 Tasley (Accomack County)
 Temperanceville (Accomack County)
 Templeton (Prince George County)
 Thynedale (Mecklenburg County)
 Timberlake (Campbell County)
 Toano (James City County)
 Triangle (Prince William County)
 Tuckahoe (Henrico County)
 Twin Lakes (Greene County)
 Tysons Corner (Fairfax County)

U
 Union Hall (Franklin County)
 Union Level (Mecklenburg County)
 University Center (Loudoun County)
 University of Virginia (Albemarle County)

V
 Vansant (Buchanan County)
 Varina (Henrico County)
 Verona (Augusta County)
 Vesuvius (Rockbridge County)
 Villa Heights (Henry County)

W
 Wakefield (Fairfax County)
 Warfield (Brunswick County)
 Warm Springs (Bath County)
 Warren (Albemarle County)
 Wattsville (Accomack County)
 West Falls Church (Fairfax County)
 West Springfield (Fairfax County)
 Westlake Corner (Franklin County)
 Weyers Cave (Augusta County)
 Whaleyville (City of Suffolk)
 Whitesville (Accomack County)
 Whitetop (Grayson County)
 Wilderness (Orange County)
 Wintergreen (Augusta County and Nelson County)
 Winterpock (Chesterfield County)
 Wolf Trap (Fairfax County)
 Woodbridge (Prince William County)
 Woodburn (Fairfax County)
 Woodlake (Chesterfield County)
 Woodlawn (Carroll County)
 Woodlawn (Fairfax County)
 Wylliesburg (Charlotte County)
 Wyndham (Henrico County)

Y
 Yogaville (Buckingham County)
 Yorkshire (Prince William County)
 Yorktown''' (York County)

Z
 Zuni (Isle Of Wight County)

Notes

References

Unincorporated towns
 
Virginia